Carino may refer to:
 Cariño, a municipality in the province of A Coruña in the autonomous community of Galicia in northwestern Spain
 Cariño (song), song recorded by American singer Jennifer Lopez
 Cariño, Paniqui, Tarlac, one of the 35 barangay of the municipality of Paniqui

People
 Carino of Balsamo,  murderer of Saint Peter of Verona  and a Dominican lay brother
 Alberta Cariño, the director of CACTUS, a community organization in Oaxaca, Mexico.
 Bugoy Cariño (born 2002), Filipino child actor and dancer
 Ledivina V. Cariño (1942-2009), Filipino sociologist and political scientist
 Mateo Cariño (1841-1908), an Ibaloi chieftain